Brotherhood of the Daleks is a Big Finish Productions audio drama based on the long-running British science fiction television series Doctor Who. It was released in late 2008.

Plot
The Doctor and Charley land in an alien jungle filled with a brotherhood of socialist Daleks. In the fourth episode the Daleks sing a Dalek version of "The Red Flag" sung to the tune of "O Tannenbaum."

Cast
The Doctor — Colin Baker
Charley Pollard — India Fisher
Mugrat — Michael Cochrane
Tamarus — Harriet Kershaw
Valion — Derek Carlyle
Nyaiad — Jo Castleton
Jesic — Alison Thea-Skot
Septal — Steve Hansell
The Daleks — Nicholas Briggs

Cast notes
Derek Carlyle has previously appeared in The Death Collectors & Spider's Shadow.

Continuity
Charley has met the Daleks twice before with the Eighth Doctor in The Time of the Daleks and at Folkestone in Terror Firma. In the latter story she met Davros as well.
The memory recalled in this story is Charley and C'rizz's escape scene from the first episode of Terror Firma.
References are made to Spiridon, the titular Planet of the Daleks.
The hallucinogenic plants encountered here were first featured in The Mind's Eye.
Dalek replicants were first used in The Chase.

External links
Big Finish Productions – Brotherhood of the Daleks

2008 audio plays
Sixth Doctor audio plays
Dalek audio plays